The Second battle of Wawer was an armed engagement between Polish and Imperial Russian troops. It happened on 31 March 1831 during the November Uprising and was one of the first battles of a successful Polish offensive planned by General Ignacy Prądzyński. The Polish success led to another victorious battle of Dębe Wielkie later that day.

References 

Battles of the November Uprising